Milenko Bojanić (24 September 1924, in Aradac – 22 May 1987, in Belgrade) was a Yugoslav politician and university professor.

References

1924 births
1987 deaths
Serbian politicians
Prime Ministers of Serbia
20th-century Serbian people
Yugoslav academics